Jimmy Terwilliger is an American football coach and former player.  He is the head football coach at East Stroudsburg University of Pennsylvania. From 2009 to 2013, he was the head football coach at Pleasant Valley High School. He played college football at East Stroudsburg, winning the 2005 Harlon Hill Trophy. Terwilliger graduated from East Stroudsburg with 17 NCAA Division II records.

College career
Terwilliger ended his career at East Stroudsburg University of Pennsylvania as a  four-time NCAA Division II All-American by the Football Gazette and the Division II National Player of the year in 2005, winning the Harlon Hill Trophy.

2005 statistics

Coaching career
Terwilliger began his coaching career in 2007 as an assistant at East Stroudsburg High School South. In 2009, he was hired as the head football coach at Pleasant Valley High School. In April 2014, Terwilliger stepped down as Pleasant Valley football coach. In July 2014, Terwilliger was hired as the quarterbacks coach for Parkland High School.

Personal life
Terwilliger is the son of Mike and Kim Terwilliger of East Stroudsburg, Pennsylvania. He is a graduate of East Stroudsburg High School South and East Stroudsburg University, where he received a bachelor of science degree in health and physical education.

On July 4, 2009, Terwilliger  married Ashlee Twigg of Sayre, Pennsylvania, a first-grade teacher at Pocono Mountain East Elementary School in Swiftwater.

Head coaching record

Notes

References

External links
 East Stroudsburg profile

Year of birth missing (living people)
1980s births
Living people
American football quarterbacks
East Stroudsburg Warriors football coaches
East Stroudsburg Warriors football players
Minnesota Vikings players
High school football coaches in Pennsylvania
People from East Stroudsburg, Pennsylvania
Coaches of American football from Pennsylvania
Players of American football from Pennsylvania